Kulul may refer to:
Kulul, California, former Costanoan settlement in Monterey County, California
Lake Kulul, in Eritrea
Kulul, Iran, a village in Bushehr Province, Iran